A money booth, also known as cash booth, money machine, and cash cube, is an arcade game and merchandiser in the form of a phone booth in which paper money (or, alternatively, coupons, tickets, or gift certificates) are blown through the air. A participant inside the booth then has to grab as many banknotes as possible in a limited amount of time.

The original portable Money Machine was created and patented in 1996 by inventor Lee Roberts of LR Money Machine. His Patent was filed on July 12, 1996. The patent includes description of a hollow frame with a plastic enclosure and an air blower to circulate paper.

Money booths are often used as eyecatchers at trade fairs, promotional events, and fundraisers, at parties such as Bar and Bat Mitzvah celebrations and at corporate entertainment events and other group events, and in casinos.

Money booths are usually rented from event management and party supply companies. Portable models can also be purchased.

References

External links 
 The Money Booths provide the necessary liveliness (essay)
 Inventor and patent holder of The Money Blowing Machine Lee Roberts page
 Patent for Money Machine

Vending machines
Merchandisers
Arcade games